Eggenberg Brewery may refer to:
Pivovar Eggenberg, a brewery in Český Krumlov, Czech Republic
Eggenberg Castle, Vorchdorf, known for its brewery, Vorchdorf, Austria